The Pine Nut mine is a large uranium mine located in the southern part of the United States in  Mohave County, Arizona.  It is located just north of the Colorado River outside the Grand Canyon National Park. Pine Nut represents one of the largest uranium reserves in the United States having estimated reserves of 24.8 million tonnes of ore grading 0.68% uranium.

References 

Uranium mines in the United States
Mines in Arizona
Geography of Mohave County, Arizona